Blessed is the fifth studio album by Jamaican musician Beenie Man, released in 1995. It is his first album to receive an international release. Blessed gained Beenie Man a large following outside of Jamaica for the first time, setting the stage for his multiple collaborations with some of the biggest American hip hop and R&B stars of the late 1990s and early 2000s.

Track listing
"Blessed" (Davis/Henton/Jackson/Morgan) – 3:39
"Slam" (Kelly) – 2:45
"Freedom" (Davis/Dennis/Dunbar/Roberts) – 4:00
"Stop Live in a de Pass" (Davis/Dunbar) – 3:51
"Acid Attack" (Davis/Dennis/Roberts/Thomas/Williams) – 3:55
"Modelling" (Davis/Fluxy/Mafia) – 3:47
"Matie a Come" (Crossdale/Davis/Dennis/Kelly/Miller) – 3:49
"Man Moving" (Davis/Dennis/Dunbar/Roberts) – 3:45
"World Dance" (Davis/Henton/Jackson) – 3:43
"Tear off Mi Garment" (Aquaman/Davis/Dennis/Jackson/Roberts/Thomas) – 3:58
"New Name" (with Lukie D.) – 3:44
"Weeping & Mourning" (Crossdale/Davis/Dennis/Miller/Roberts) – 3:52
"Heaven Vs. Hell" (Davis/Dennis/Dunbar/Morgan) – 3:46
"See a Man Face" (Crossdale/Davis/Dennis/Jackson/Miller/Roberts) – 3:46

Personnel
Beenie "Moses Davis" Man  -   Arranger, Producer, Vocals
Computer Paul	 - 	Bass, Keyboards, Programming
Donald Dennis	 - 	Bass, Keyboards
Lynford "Fatta" Marshall	 - 	Arranger, Producer
Fluxy	 - 	Programming
Leroy Mafia	 - 	Bass, Keyboards
Gary Jackson	 - 	Engineer
Patrick Roberts	 - 	Producer
Andrew Thomas	 - 	Programming
Collin "Bulbie" York	 - 	Arranger, Producer
Paul "Wrong Move" Crossdale	 - 	Keyboards
Madhouse Crew	 - 	Arranger
Dean Mundy	 - 	Engineer
The Shocking Vibes Crew	 - 	Arranger, Producer
Lukie D	 - 	Performer
Dave Kelly	 - 	Bass, Keyboards, Programming, Producer, Engineer

Charts
Blessed peaked at No. 15 on the Billboard Reggae Albums chart.

Singles

References

Beenie Man albums
1995 albums